Eric Schwitzgebel is an American philosopher and professor of Philosophy at the University of California, Riverside.  His main interests include connections between empirical psychology and philosophy of mind and the nature of belief.
He received his PhD from University of California, Berkeley under the supervision of Elisabeth A. Lloyd, Alison Gopnik, and John Searle. 

Schwitzgebel has studied the behavior of philosophers, particularly ethicists, using empirical methods. The articles he has published investigate whether ethicists behave more ethically than other populations. In a 2009 study, Schwitzgebel investigated the rate at which ethics books were missing from academic libraries compared to similar philosophy books. The study found that ethics books were in fact missing at higher rates than comparable texts in other disciplines. Subsequent research has measured the behavior of ethicists at conferences, the perceptions of other philosophers about ethicists, and the self-reported behavior of ethicists. Schwitzgebel's research did not find that the ethical behavior of ethicists differed from the behavior of professors in other disciplines. In addition, his research found that the moral beliefs of professional philosophers were just as susceptible to being influenced by irrelevant factors as non-philosophers were. Schwitzgebel has concluded that, "Professional ethicists appear to behave no differently than do non-ethicists of similar social background."

References

External links
 Personal Weblog
 Eric Schwitzgebel in Google Scholar
 

Stanford University alumni
Living people
Analytic philosophers
Philosophers of mind
American philosophers
University of California, Riverside faculty
University of California, Berkeley alumni
Year of birth missing (living people)